Clingman may refer to:

Clingman, North Carolina
Clingman Avenue Historic District
Clingman Peak
Clingman (surname)